Hebeloma marginatulum is a species of mushroom in the family Hymenogastraceae.

marginatulum
Fungi of Europe